Klek is a peninsula in the Adriatic Sea located southwest of Neum, Bosnia and Herzegovina. It encloses the Bay of Neum, separating it from the larger Bay of Mali Ston and the Pelješac peninsula. At the cape of peninsula, a few hundred meters from the shore, is a small islet as part of a reef consisting series of bare rocks appearing under the water table. It is called Lopata, and at the tip of the reef there is a lighthouse Lopata. Also at the very tip of the peninsula there is the Rep Kleka lighthouse

The tip of the peninsula, known as Rep Kleka (also known as Ponta repa and Turski rep), that lies directly across the eponymous village of Klek in Croatia, is disputed between Bosnia and Herzegovina and Croatia, who last negotiated its status in the 1999 Neum Agreement.

See also
Veliki Školj
Mali Školj

References

Sources

External links
 Neum-Klek archipelago 12. January 2022

Bosnia and Herzegovina–Croatia border
Adriatic Sea
Landforms of Bosnia and Herzegovina
Geography of Bosnia and Herzegovina
Peninsulas of Bosnia and Herzegovina